Khosrow II (spelled Chosroes II in classical sources), also known as Khosrow Parviz (New Persian: , "Khosrow the Victorious"), is considered to be the last great Sasanian king (shah) of Iran, ruling from 590 to 628, with an interruption of one year.

Khosrow II was the son of Hormizd IV (reigned 579–590), and the grandson of Khosrow I (reigned 531–579). He was the last king of Iran to have a lengthy reign before the Muslim conquest of Iran, which began five years after his execution. He lost his throne, then recovered it with the help of the Byzantine emperor Maurice, and, a decade later, went on to emulate the feats of the Achaemenids, conquering the rich Roman provinces of the Middle East; much of his reign was spent in wars with the Byzantine Empire and struggling against usurpers such as Bahram Chobin and Vistahm.

After the Byzantines killed Maurice, Khosrow II began a war in 602 against the Byzantines. Khosrow II's forces captured much of the Byzantine Empire's territories, earning the king the epithet "the Victorious". A siege of the Byzantine capital of Constantinople in 626 was unsuccessful, and Heraclius, now allied with Turks, started a risky but successful counterattack deep into Persia's heartland. Supported by the feudal families of the empire, Khosrow II's imprisoned son Sheroe (Kavad II) imprisoned and killed Khosrow II. This led to a civil war and interregnum in the empire and the reversal of all Sasanian gains in the war against the Byzantines.

In works of Persian literature such as the Ferdowsi's Shahnameh and Nizami Ganjavi's (1141–1209) Khosrow and Shirin, a famous tragic romance and a highly elaborated fictional version of Khosrow's life made him one of the greatest heroes of the culture, as much a lover as a king. Khosrow and Shirin tells the story of his love for the Aramean/Roman princess Shirin, who becomes his queen after a lengthy courtship strewn with mishaps and difficulties.

Name 

"Khosrow" is the New Persian variant of his name used by scholars; his original name was Middle Persian, Husraw, itself derived from Avestan Haosrauuah ("he who has good fame"). The name is transliterated in Greek as Chosroes (Χοσρόης) and in Arabic as Kisra. His name in combination with the epithet "Parviz" is attested in Georgian as K‛asre Ambarvez (Pseudo-Juansher, writing around the year 800) and in Armenian as Aprouēž Xosrov.

Background 
Her brothers, Vinduyih and Vistahm, were to have a profound influence in Khosrow II's early life. Khosrow's paternal grandfather was the famed Sasanian shah Khosrow I Anushirvan, whilst his paternal grandmother was the daughter of the khagan of the Khazars. Khosrow is first mentioned in the 580s, when he was at Partaw, the capital of Caucasian Albania. During his stay there, he served as the governor of the kingdom, and managed to put an end to the Kingdom of Iberia and make it into a Sasanian province. Furthermore, Khosrow II also served as the governor of Arbela in Mesopotamia sometime before his accession to the throne.

Rebellion of Bahram Chobin

Overthrow of Hormizd IV and accession 

In 590, Hormizd IV had his prominent general Bahram Chobin disgraced and dismissed. Bahram, infuriated by Hormizd's actions, responded by rebelling, and due to his noble status and great military knowledge, was joined by his soldiers and many others. He then appointed a new governor for Khorasan, and afterwards set for the Sasanian capital of Ctesiphon. The legitimacy of the House of Sasan was based on acceptance that the halo of kingship, the xwarrah, was given to the first Sasanian shah, Ardashir I and his family following the latter's conquest of the Parthian Empire. This was now, however, disputed by Bahram Chobin, thus marking the first time in Sasanian history that a Parthian dynast challenged the legitimacy of the Sasanian family by rebelling.

Meanwhile, Hormizd tried to come to terms with his brothers-in-law Vistahm and Vinduyih, who according to the Syriac writer Joshua the Stylite, both "equally hated Hormizd". The two brothers overthrew Hormizd in a seemingly bloodless palace revolution. They had Hormizd blinded with a red-hot needle, and put Khosrow II on the throne. Sometime in the summer of 590, the two brothers then had Hormizd killed, with at least the implicit approval of Khosrow II. Nevertheless, Bahram Chobin continued his march to Ctesiphon, now with the pretext of claiming to avenge Hormizd.

Khosrow then took a carrot and stick attitude, and wrote a message to Bahram Chobin, stressing his rightful claim to the Sasanian kingship: "Khosrow, kings of kings, ruler over the ruling, lord of the peoples, prince of peace, salvation of men, among gods the good and eternally living man, among men the most esteemed god, the highly illustrious, the victor, the one who rises with the sun and who lends the night his eyesight, the one famed through his ancestors, the king who hates, the benefactor who engaged the Sasanians and saved the Iranians their kingship—to Bahram, the general of the Iranians, our friend.... We have also taken over the royal throne in a lawful manner and have upset no Iranian customs.... We have so firmly decided not to take off the diadem that we even expected to rule over other worlds, if this were possible.... If you wish your welfare, think about what is to be done."

Fight 

Bahram Chobin, however, ignored his warning—a few days later, he reached the Nahrawan Canal near Ctesiphon, where he fought Khosrow's men, who were heavily outnumbered, but managed to hold Bahram Chobin's men back in several clashes. However, Khosrow's men eventually began losing their morale, and were in the end defeated by Bahram Chobin's forces. Khosrow, together with his two uncles, his wives, and a retinue of 30 nobles, thereafter fled to Byzantine territory, while Ctesiphon fell to Bahram Chobin. Bahram Chobin declared himself king of kings in the summer of 590, asserting that the first Sasanian king Ardashir I had usurped the throne of the Arsacids, and that he now was restoring their rule.

Bahram Chobin tried to support his cause with the Zoroastrian apocalyptic belief that by the end of Zoroaster's millennium, chaos and destructive wars with the Hephthalites/Huns and the Romans occurs and then a savior would appear. Indeed, the Sasanians had misidentified Zoroaster's era with that of the Seleucids (312 BC), which put Bahram Chobin's life almost at the end of Zoroaster's millennium, he was therefore hailed by many as the promised savior Kay Bahram Varjavand. Bahram was to re-establish the Arsacid Empire and commenced a new millennium of dynastic rule. He started minting coins, where he is on the front imitated as an exalted figure, bearded and wearing a crenellation-shaped crown with two crescents of the moon, whilst the reverse shows the traditional fire altar flanked by two attendants. Regardless, many nobles and priests still chose to side with the inexperienced and less dominant Khosrow II.

In order to get the attention of the Byzantine emperor Maurice (r. 582–602), Khosrow II went to Syria, and sent a message to the Sasanian occupied city of Martyropolis to stop their resistance against the Byzantines, but with no avail. He then sent a message to Maurice, and requested his help to regain the Sasanian throne, which the Byzantine emperor agreed with; in return, the Byzantines would re-gain sovereignty over the cities of Amida, Carrhae, Dara and Martyropolis. Furthermore, Iran was required to stop intervening in the affairs of Iberia and Armenia, effectively ceding control of Lazistan to the Byzantines.

Return to Iran

In 591, Khosrow moved to Constantia and prepared to invade Bahram Chobin's territories in Mesopotamia, while Vistahm and Vinduyih were raising an army in Adurbadagan under the observation of the Byzantine commander John Mystacon, who was also raising an army in Armenia. After some time, Khosrow, along with the Byzantine commander of the south, Comentiolus, invaded Mesopotamia. During this invasion, Nisibis and Martyropolis quickly defected to them, and Bahram Chobin's commander Zatsparham was defeated and killed. One of Bahram Chobin's other commanders, Bryzacius, was captured in Mosil and had his nose and ears cut off, and was thereafter sent to Khosrow, where he was killed. Khosrow II and the Byzantine general Narses then penetrated deeper into Bahram's territory, seizing Dara and then Mardin in February, where Khosrow was re-proclaimed king. Shortly after this, Khosrow sent one of his Iranian supporters, Mahbodh, to capture Ctesiphon, which he managed to accomplish.

At the same time a force of 8,000 Iranians under Vistahm and Vinduyih and 12,000 Armenians under Mushegh II Mamikonian invaded Adurbadagan. Bahram Chobin tried to disrupt the force by writing a letter to Mushegh II, the letter said: "As for you Armenians who demonstrate an unseasonable loyalty, did not the house of Sasan destroy your land and sovereignty? Why otherwise did your fathers rebel and extricate themselves from their service, fighting up until today for your country?" Bahram Chobin in his letter promised that the Armenians would become partners of the new Iranian empire ruled by a Parthian dynastic family if he accepted his proposal to betray Khosrow II. Mushegh, however, rejected the offer.

Bahram Chobin was then defeated at the Battle of Blarathon, forcing him to flee with 4,000 men eastwards. He marched towards Nishapur, where he defeated a pursuing army as well as an army led by a Karenid nobleman at Qumis. Constantly troubled, he crossed the Oxus river, where he was received honorably by the Khagan of the Turks, who was most likely Birmudha—the same Turkic prince that Bahram Chobin had defeated and captured a few years earlier during his wars against the Turks. Bahram Chobin entered his service, and was appointed as a commander in the army, achieving further military accomplishments there. Bahram Chobin became a highly popular figure after saving the Khagan from a conspiracy instigated by the latters brother Byghu (conceivably an incorrect translation of yabghu). Khosrow II, however, could not feel safe as long as Bahram Chobin lived, and succeeded in having him assassinated. The assassination was reportedly achieved through distribution of presents and bribes between the members of the Turkic royal family, notably the queen. What remained of Bahram Chobin's supporters went back to northern Iran and joined the rebellion of Vistahm (590/1–596 or 594/5–600).

Consolidation of the empire

Domestic affairs and relations with the Byzantines
With Khosrow's rule now restored, his aim was to now consolidate his grip over his realm, which included showing tolerance and support to his Christian subjects. His wife Shirin—a Christian from Khuzestan—was the most influential of his wives, playing an important role in the royal favour that the Mesopotamian Christians enjoyed. She had a church and monastery constructed near the palace in Ctesiphon, which was used to receive a portion of the treasury for the wages of the clergy and their vestments. The Arab Lakhmids/Nasrids, a client state located at al-Hira and its surroundings, could now openly convert to Nestorian Christianity without angering the Sasanian court.

The Iranians and the Byzantines enjoyed good relations with each other for the first eleven years. This was apparent in their management of the issues that had risen in Armenia. In the 590s, many Armenian nobles and their supporters sought asylum in Iran to avoid being conscripted for Maurice's Balkan campaigns. The open borders between the two empires meant that nobles could freely immigrate to Iran and get promoted. However, when they showed signs of aspiring to fight the Byzantines, the Iranians worked together with the Byzantines to deal with the issue.

Revolt of Vistahm
After his victory, Khosrow rewarded his uncles with high positions: Vinduyih became treasurer and first minister and Vistahm received the post of spahbed of the East, encompassing Tabaristan and Khorasan, which was the traditional homeland of the Ispahbudhan. Soon, however, Khosrow changed his intentions: trying to disassociate himself from his father's murder, he decided to execute his uncles. The Sasanian monarchs' traditional mistrust of over-powerful magnates and Khosrow's personal resentment of Vinduyih's patronising manner certainly contributed to this decision. Vinduyih was soon put to death, according to a Syriac source captured while trying to flee to his brother in the East.

At the news of his brother's murder, Vistahm rose in open revolt. According to Dinawari, Vistahm sent a letter to Khosrow announcing his claim to the throne through his Parthian (Arsacid) heritage: "You are not worthier to rule than I am. Indeed, I am more deserving on account of my descent from Darius, son of Darius, who fought Alexander. You Sasanians deceitfully gained superiority over us [the Arsacids] and usurped our right, and treated us with injustice. Your ancestor Sasan was no more than a shepherd." Vistahm's revolt, like Bahrams's shortly before, found support and spread quickly. Local magnates as well as the remnants of Bahram Chobin's armies flocked to him, especially after he married Bahram's sister Gordiya. Vistahm repelled several loyalist efforts to subdue him, and he soon held sway in the entire eastern and northern quadrants of the Iranian realm, a domain stretching from the Oxus river to the region of Ardabil in the west. He even campaigned in the east, where he subdued two Hephthalite princes of Transoxiana, Shaug and Pariowk. The date of Vistahm's uprising is uncertain. From his coinage, it is known that his rebellion lasted for seven years. The commonly accepted dates are ca. 590–596, but some scholars like J.D. Howard–Johnston and Parvaneh Pourshariati push its outbreak later, in 594/5, to coincide with the Armenian Vahewuni rebellion.

As Vistahm began to threaten Media, Khosrow sent several armies against his uncle, but failed to achieve a decisive result: Vistahm and his followers retreated to the mountainous region of Gilan, while several Armenian contingents of the royal army rebelled and defected to Vistahm. Finally, Khosrow called upon the services of the Armenian Smbat Bagratuni, who engaged Vistahm near Qumis. During the battle, Vistahm was murdered by Pariowk at Khosrow's urging (or, according to an alternative account, by his wife Gordiya). Nevertheless, Vistahm's troops managed to repel the royal army at Qumis, and it required another expedition by Smbat in the next year to finally end the rebellion.

Abolition of the Lakhmid dynasty 
In 600, Khosrow II executed Al-Nu'man III, King of the Lakhmids of Al-Hira, presumably because of the Arab king's refusal to give him his daughter al-Ḥurqah in marriage and insulting Persian women. Afterwards the central government took over the defense of the western frontiers to the desert, and the buffer state of the Lakhmids vanished. This ultimately facilitated the Muslim Caliphs' invasion and conquest of Lower Iraq, less than a decade after Khosrow's death.

Byzantine–Sasanian War of 602–628

Initial Iranian invasion and dominance 

Toward the beginning of his reign, Khosrow II had good relations with the Byzantines. However, when in 602 Emperor Maurice was murdered by his General Phocas (602–610), who usurped the Roman (Byzantine) throne, Khosrow launched an offensive against Constantinople: ostensibly to avenge Maurice's death, but his aim clearly included the annexation of as much Byzantine territory as was feasible. Khosrow II, along with Shahrbaraz and his other best generals, quickly captured Dara and Edessa in 604, and recaptured lost territory in the north, which made the Sasanian–Byzantine borders go back to the pre-591 frontier before Khosrow gave Maurice territory in return for military aid against Bahram Chobin. After having reclaimed lost territory, Khosrow withdrew from the battlefield and handed military operations to Shahrbaraz and Shahin Vahmanzadegan. The Sasanian armies then invaded and plundered Syria and Asia Minor, and in 608 advanced into Chalcedon.

In 610, Heraclius revolted against Phocas and killed him, crowning himself as Emperor of the Byzantine Empire. He then tried to negotiate peace with Khosrow II by sending diplomats to his court. Khosrow, however, rejected their offer and said: "That kingdom belongs to me, and I shall enthrone Maurice's son, Theodosius, as emperor. [As for Heraclius], he went and took the rule without our order and now offers us our own treasure as gifts. But I shall not stop until I have him in my hands." Khosrow then had the diplomats executed.

In 613 and 614, General Shahrbaraz besieged and captured Damascus and Jerusalem, and the True Cross was carried away in triumph. Soon afterwards, Shahin marched through Anatolia, defeating the Byzantines numerous times; he conquered Egypt in 618. The Byzantines could offer but little resistance, as they were torn apart by internal dissensions, and pressed by the Avars and Slavs, who were invading the Empire from across the Danube River. In 622/3, Rhodes and several other islands in the eastern Aegean fell to the Sasanians, threatening a naval assault on Constantinople. Such was the despair in Constantinople that Heraclius considered moving the government to Carthage in Africa.

Turko-Hephthalite invasion 
In ca. 606/607, Khosrow recalled Smbat IV Bagratuni from Sasanian Armenia and sent him to repel the Turko-Hephthalites, who had raided as far as Spahan in central Iran. Smbat, with the aid of an Iranian prince named Datoyean, repelled the Turko-Hephthalites from Iran, and plundered their domains in eastern Khorasan, where Smbat is said to have killed their king in single combat. Khosrow then gave Smbat the honorific title Khosrow Shun ("the Joy or Satisfaction of Khosrow"), while his son Varaztirots II Bagratuni received the honorific name Javitean Khosrow ("Eternal Khosrow").

Sebeos describes the event as:

Byzantine counter-offensive and resurgence 

In 622, despite the major progress the Sasanians were making in the area of the Aegean Sea, the Byzantine Emperor Heraclius was able to take the field with a powerful force. In 624, he advanced into northern Adurbadagan, where he was welcomed by Farrukh Hormizd and his son Rostam Farrokhzad who had rebelled against Khosrow. Heraclius then began sacking several cities and temples, including the Adur Gushnasp temple.

In 626 Heraclius captured Lazistan (Colchis). Later that same year, Shahrbaraz advanced on Chalcedon on the Bosphoros and attempted to capture Constantinople with the help of Avar and Slavic allies. In this siege of Constantinople in 626, the combined Sassanid, Slavic and Avar forces failed to capture the Byzantine capital city. The Avars did not have the patience or technology to conquer the city. On top of that, the Iranians, who were siege warfare experts, were unable to transport their troops and equipment to the other side of the Bosphorus where their Slavic and Avar allies were located, due to heavy guarding of the strait by the Byzantine navy. Furthermore, the walls of Constantinople were easily defended against the siege towers and engines. Another reason was that the Persians and Slavs did not have a strong enough navy to skirt the sea walls and establish a channel of communication. The lack of supplies for the Avars eventually caused them to abandon the siege. As this maneuver failed, Shahrbaraz' forces were defeated, and he withdrew his army from Anatolia later in 628.

Following the Third Perso-Turkic War in 627, Heraclius defeated the Iranian army at the Battle of Nineveh and advanced towards Ctesiphon. Khosrow II fled from his favorite residence, Dastagird (near Ctesiphon), without offering resistance. Heraclius then captured Dastagird and plundered it.

Overthrow and death 

After the capture of Dastagird, the son of Khosrow, Sheroe, was released by the feudal families of the Sasanian Empire, which included the Ispahbudhan spahbed Farrukh Hormizd and his two sons Rostam Farrokhzad and Farrukhzad. Shahrbaraz of the Mihran family, the Armenian faction represented by Varaztirots II Bagratuni, and finally Kanadbak of the Kanārangīyān family. On the night of 25 February, the night-watch of the Sasanian capital of Ctesiphon, which would usually shout the name of the reigning shah, shouted the name of Sheroe instead, which indicated a coup d'état was taking place. Sheroe, with Aspad Gushnasp leading his army, captured Ctesiphon and imprisoned Khosrow II in the house of a certain Mehr-Sepand (also known as Maraspand). Sheroe, who had now assumed the dynastic name of Kavad II, then ordered Aspad Gushnasp to lead the charge of accusations against the deposed shah. Khosrow, however, dismissed all accusations one by one.

Kavad shortly proceeded to have all his brothers and half-brothers executed, including the heir Mardanshah, who was Khosrow's favourite son. The murder of all his brothers, "all well-educated, valiant, and chivalrous men", stripped the Sasanian dynasty of a future competent ruler, and has been described as a "mad rampage" and "reckless". Three days later he ordered Mihr Hormozd to execute Khosrow. However, after the regicide of his father, Kavad also proceeded to have Mihr Hormozd killed. Khosrow's daughters Boran and Azarmidokht reportedly criticized and scolded Kavad for his barbaric actions, which made him filled with remorse. With the support of the Iranian nobles, Kavad then made peace with the Byzantine emperor Heraclius, which made the Byzantines regain all their lost territories, their captured soldiers, a war indemnity, along with the True Cross and other relics that were lost in Jerusalem in 614.

Due to Kavad's actions, his reign is seen as a turning point in Sasanian history, and has been argued by some scholars as playing a key role in the fall of the Sasanian Empire. The overthrow and death of Khosrow culminated in a chaotic civil war, with the most powerful members of the nobility gaining full autonomy and starting to create their own government. The hostilities between the Persian (Parsig) and Parthian (Pahlav) noble-families were also resumed, which split up the wealth of the nation. The civil war finally ended when Khosrow's eight year old grandson, Yazdegerd III, ascended the throne. The young king, however, inherited a disintegrating empire, which was dealt its last blow in 651 during the Arab conquest of Iran.

Religious policy and beliefs 
Khosrow II, like all other Sasanian rulers, was an adherent of Zoroastrianism. Since the 5th-century, the Sasanian monarchs had been made aware of the significance of the religious minorities in the realm, and as a result tried to homogenize them into a structure of administration where according to legal principles, all would be treated straightforwardly as mard / zan ī šahr, i.e. "man/woman citizen (of the Empire)". Jews and (notably) Christians had accepted the concept of Iran and considered themselves part of the nation.

During his reign there was constant conflict between Monophysite and Nestorian Christians. Khosrow favored the Monophysites, and ordered all his subjects to adhere to Monophysitism, perhaps under the influence of Shirin and the royal physician Gabriel of Sinjar, who both supported this faith. Khosrow also dispensed money or gifts to Christian shrines. Khosrow's great tolerance to Christianity and friendship with the Christian Byzantines even made some Armenian writers think that Khosrow was a Christian. His positive policy toward Christians (which, however, was probably politically motivated) made him unpopular with the Zoroastrian priests, and also made Christianity greatly spread around the Sasanian Empire. During Khosrow's war with the Byzantines, Christian elites and organizations were incorporated into the Sasanian system, as part of his attempt to absorb the Byzantine realm into his expanded empire. The condition of the Christian nobility reached its pinnacle under Khosrow. Mushegh II Mamikonian, a prominent Armenian nakharar, is the first and only Christian nobleman that is praised by courtly historiographers, due to his rejection of the enticements of Bahram Chobin. His decision to choose Khosrow over his native Armenia, gained him a place in the Shahnameh, the national epic of Iran. Smbat IV Bagratuni likewise led an illustrious career under Khosrow, rising to the office of frontier commander of Gorgan, possibly the most vital and contested area of the Sasanian realm. As a reward for his accomplishments in the east, Smbat was appointed the leader of the military jurisdiction in the Caucasus. Furthermore, his aristocratic house–the Bagratunids–was made the pillar of Sasanian authority in the area.

Khosrow also paid attention to the Zoroastrians, and had various fire temples constructed. However, this did not help the Zoroastrian church, which was in a heavy decline during his reign. According to Richard N. Frye, the Zoroastrian church under Khosrow "was noted for its devotion to luxury more than its devotion to thought."

Music during the reign of Khosrow II 
Khosrow II's reign was considered a golden age in music. Before Khosrow II there were many other Sasanian kings that showed particular interest in music, like Khosrow I, Bahram Gur, and even Ardashir I. Notable musicians during the reign of Khosrow II were Barbad (Khosrow's favorite court musician), Bamshad, Sarkash, and Nagisa.

Rock reliefs 

Khosrow restored the practice of erecting rock reliefs, after an absence of nearly three centuries, the last one being erected under Shapur III. At Taq-e Bostan, Khosrow mimicked and magnified the rock relief of Shapur III. His relief, known as the "Great Ayvan", is in a barrel vault carved in a cliff. The ayvan is split into an upper and lower section; the upper section depicts a divine investiture scene, with the Zoroastrian divinities Ahura Mazda and Anahita each giving Khosrow a diadem. The lower section depicts Khosrow II on horseback, wearing full body armor, whilst holding a lance and shield. His head is encircled by a halo, which according to Howard-Johnston, is most likely a representation of his xwarrah, i.e. kingly glory. On the left side panel, a boar hunt scene is depicted, portraying Khosrow on a boat whilst aiming a bow. On the right, there is a deer hunt scene. The relief, however, is unfinished, probably due to Khosrow's setback in the later stages of the war and his eventual downfall.

Coinage 

Khosrow, during his second reign, added the ideogram GDH, meaning xwarrah ("royal splendor") on his coins. He combined this together with the word abzōt ("he has increased"), making the full inscription thus read as: "Khosrow, he has increased the royal splendor" (Khūsrōkhwarrah abzōt). The title of King of Kings–missing since the reign of Peroz I–was also restored on his coins. According to Shayegan, Khosrow's adoption of the title was "undoubtedly a consequence of his Byzantine policy," and was signifying a resurrection of the ancient Achaemenid Empire. His two successors, Kavad II and Ardashir III, refrained from using the title, seemingly in order distance themselves from him.

Khosrow II in Islamic tradition 
Islamic tradition tells a story in which Khosrow II (in  Transliteration: Kisra) was a Persian king to whom Muhammad had sent a messenger, Abdullah ibn Hudhafah as-Sahmi, along with a letter in which Khosrow was asked to preach the religion of Islam. The account as transmitted by Muslim tradition reads:

Islamic tradition further states that Khosrow II tore up Muhammad's letter saying, "A pitiful slave among my subjects dares write his name before mine"  and commanded Badhan, his vassal ruler of Yemen, to dispatch two valiant men to identify, seize and bring this man from Hijaz (Muhammad) to him. When Abdullah ibn Hudhafah as-Sahmi told Muhammad how Khosrow had torn his letter to pieces, Muhammad promised the destruction of Khosrow II stating, "Even so, Allah shall destroy his kingdom." Later, Badhan's men arrived in Medina and talked to Muhammad, ordering him to accompany them back to Khosrow II. Muhammad reportedly changed the subject, made it obvious he did not like their appearance, and responded by asking why they shave their beards and leave their mustaches to grow and be that large. When they said that's what their god orders them to do, he said his god orders him to cut his mustache and grow his beard. After he took control of the conversation like that, he went back on-topic and asked them to come back to him the next day. When they did, he informed them that Khosrow II had been killed by his son. Badhan's men responded angrily, threatening Muhammad to tell Badhan what he is saying about Khosrow II. To that, he responded by encouraging them to write to Badhan and to also tell him that Islam and its power will reach all that Khosrow II has ever ruled over. A few days later, Badhan received confirmation from Persia that Khosrow II was dead. As a consequence, he is said to have accepted Islam, and Muhammad kept him as a ruler over his people.

In art 

The battles between Heraclius and Khosrow are depicted in a famous early Renaissance fresco by Piero della Francesca, part of the History of the True Cross cycle in the church of San Francesco, Arezzo. Many Persian miniature paintings depict events in his life, like his battles or his assassination.

Family 
Khosrow was the son of Hormizd IV, and an unnamed Ispahbudhan noblewoman who was the sister of Vistahm and Vinduyih. Khosrow also had two cousins from the Ispahbudhan family whom were named Mah-Adhur Gushnasp and Narsi. He had a brother-in-law named Hormuzan, a Sasanian nobleman from one of the seven Parthian clans, who later fought against the Arabs during the Muslim invasion of Persia. However, this is most likely wrong since Kavad's mother was a Byzantine princess named Maria.

Khosrow married three times: first to Maria, a daughter of the Byzantine emperor Maurice, who bore him Kavad II. Then to Gordiya, the sister of Bahram Chobin, who bore him Javanshir. Then to Shirin, who bore him Mardanshah. Khosrow also had other children whom were named: Borandukht, Azarmidokht, Shahriyar and Farrukhzad Khosrow V. All these persons except Shahriyar would later become the monarch of Iran during the Sasanian civil war of 628-632. Khosrow had a brother named Kavad and a sister named Mirhran, who was married to the Sasanian spahbed Shahrbaraz, and later bore him Shapur-i Shahrvaraz, while Kavad married an unnamed woman who bore him Khosrow III.

Family tree

See also 

Babai the Great
Behistun Inscription
Behistun Palace
Kisra legend, an African migration myth that historian Leo Frobenius argued was based on Khosrow II
Muqawqis, Ruler of Alexandria
Non-Muslim interactants with Muslims during Muhammad's era
Shabdiz Khosrow's highly admired horse
 Ganj-e Badavard

Notes

References

Sources 

 
 Baca, Winters, Keenan. He Did Not Fear: Xusro Parviz, King of Kings of the Sasanian Empire. Gorgias Press, 2019. 
 Baca-Winters, Keenan. "From Rome to Iran: Identity and Xusro II." PhD. diss., University of California, Irvine, 2015. https://escholarship.org/uc/item/1rp8c11b
 
 
  
 
 Edward Walford, translator, The Ecclesiastical History of Evagrius: A History of the Church from AD 431 to AD 594, 1846. Reprinted 2008. Evolution Publishing, .  – a primary source containing detailed information about the early reign of Khosrow II and his relationship with the Romans.
 
 
 
 

 
 
 
 
 
 
 
 

 
 
 
 
  
 
 
 

 
 
 
 

 
570s births
628 deaths
6th-century Sasanian monarchs
7th-century Sasanian monarchs
Leaders ousted by a coup
One Thousand and One Nights characters
People of the Byzantine–Sasanian War of 602–628
Caucasian Albania
Governors of the Sasanian Empire
Shahnameh characters
Executed monarchs